The Runaways is an American drama television series. The series stars Michael Biehn, Alan Feinstein, Patti Cohoon-Friedman, James Callahan, Karen Machon and Robert Reed. The series aired from April 27, 1978, to September 4, 1979, on NBC.

Synopsis
A team headed by a psychologist looks for runaway teens in order to help them.

Cast
Michael Biehn as Mark Johnson 
Alan Feinstein as Steve Arizzio 
Patti Cohoon-Friedman as Debbie Shaw 
James Callahan as Sergeant Hal Grady 
Karen Machon as Karen Wingate 
Robert Reed as David McKay 
Ruth Cox as Susan Donovan
Wayne Coy as Runaway Boy (pilot)

Episodes

Series overview

Season 1 (1978)

Season 2 (1979)

References

External links
 

1978 American television series debuts
1979 American television series endings
English-language television shows
NBC original programming
Television shows set in Philadelphia